Shearella is a genus of Asian araneomorph spiders in the family Tetrablemmidae that was first described by Pekka T. Lehtinen in 1981.

Species
 it contains four species, found in Asia:
Shearella alii Sankaran & Sebastian, 2016 – India
Shearella lilawati Lehtinen, 1981 (type) – Sri Lanka
Shearella sanya Lin & Li, 2010 – China
Shearella selvarani Lehtinen, 1981 – Sri Lanka

See also
 List of Tetrablemmidae species

References

Araneomorphae genera
Spiders of Asia
Spiders of Madagascar
Taxa named by Pekka T. Lehtinen
Tetrablemmidae